UFC on Fuel TV: Muñoz vs. Weidman (also known as UFC on Fuel TV 4) was a mixed martial arts event held by the Ultimate Fighting Championship. The event took place on July 11, 2012, at the HP Pavilion in San Jose, California.

Background
Paul Taylor was expected to face Anthony Njokuani at the event. However, Taylor was forced out of the bout with an injury and replaced by Rafael dos Anjos.

Jon Fitch was expected to face Aaron Simpson at the event. However, Fitch was forced out of the bout, citing a knee injury and replaced by Kenny Robertson.

Brandon Vera was expected to face James Te Huna at the event.  However, Vera was pulled from the bout with Te Huna and was tabbed to face Maurício Rua at UFC on Fox: Shogun vs. Vera. While Te Huna faced returning veteran Joey Beltran.

Results

Bonus Awards
Fighters were awarded $40,000 bonuses.

 Fight of the Night: James Te-Huna vs. Joey Beltran
 Knockout of the Night: Chris Weidman
 Submission of the Night: Alex Caceres

Reported Payout

The following is the reported payout to the fighters as reported to the California State Athletic Commission. It does not include sponsor money and also does not include the UFC's traditional "fight night" bonuses.

Chris Weidman: $44,000 (includes $22,000 win bonus) def. Mark Muñoz: $42,000
James Te-Huna: $28,000 (includes $14,000 win bonus) def. Joey Beltran: $15,000
Aaron Simpson: $46,000 (includes $23,000 win bonus) def. Kenny Robertson: $8,000
Francis Carmont: $20,000 (includes $10,000 win bonus) def. Karlos Vemola: $14,000
T.J. Dillashaw: $20,000 (includes $10,000 win bonus) def. Vaughan Lee: $8,000
Rafael dos Anjos: $40,000 (includes $20,000 win bonus) def. Anthony Njokuani: $14,000
Alex Caceres: $20,000 (includes $10,000 win bonus) def. Damacio Page: $11,000
Chris Cariaso: $20,000 (includes $10,000 win bonus) def. Josh Ferguson: $8,000
Andrew Craig: $16,000 (includes $8,000 win bonus) def. Rafael Natal: $12,000
Marcelo Guimarães: $12,000 (includes $6,000 win bonus) def. Dan Stittgen: $6,000
Raphael Assunção : $34,000 (includes $17,000 win bonus) def. Issei Tamura: $8,000

See also
List of UFC events
2012 in UFC

References

External links
 Official UFC past events page
 UFC events results at Sherdog.com

UFC on Fuel TV
2012 in mixed martial arts
Mixed martial arts in San Jose, California
Sports competitions in San Jose, California
2012 in sports in California
Events in San Jose, California